Spathanthus is a group of plants in the family Rapateaceae described as a genus in 1828.

The genus is native to South America.

 Species
 Spathanthus bicolor Ducke - SE Colombia (Amazonas), S Venezuela (Amazonas), N Brazil (Amazonas)
 Spathanthus unilateralis (Rudge) Desv.  N Brazil (Pará, Amapá, Amazonas),  S Venezuela (Amazonas), Guyana, Suriname, French Guiana

References

Poales genera
Rapateaceae